Feltonville is an unincorporated community in Wake County in the U.S. state of North Carolina. It is located north of Holly Springs, near where North Carolina Highway 540 meets North Carolina Highway 55, south of Apex.

External links
 Feltonville at the U.S. Geographic Names Information System

Research Triangle
Unincorporated communities in North Carolina
Unincorporated communities in Wake County, North Carolina